Mikołaj Rej or Mikołaj Rey of Nagłowice (4 February 1505 – between 8 September/5 October 1569) was a Polish poet and prose writer of the emerging Renaissance in Poland as it succeeded the Middle Ages, as well as a politician and musician. He was the first Polish author to write exclusively in the Polish language, and is considered (with Biernat of Lublin and Jan Kochanowski), to be one of the founders of Polish literary language and literature.

Life
Rej was born into a noble family (bearers of the Oksza coat of arms) at Żurawno, near Halicz. His father Stanisław, "a pious, honourable, and quiet man", had (with the help of a relative who was Archbishop of Lwów), moved to Ruthenia from Nagłowice, near Kraków at the invitation of archbishop Jan Wątróbka. His mother, Barbara Herburt, married Rej's father there as his second wife. Although young Rej received little formal education in Lwów, and, at the age of 13 attended but one year at the Kraków Academy, he managed to educate himself by studying Latin literature.

In approximately 1524, Rej began his service at the court of voivode Andrzej Tęczyński in Sandomierz. There, he acquired most of his vast knowledge in the field of humanities. He returned to his family's town of Topola and married Zofia Kosnówna (Kościeniówna). In 1531 Rej moved to Kobyle, in the Chełm area, which had been bequeathed to his wife, and thereafter, he frequented the court of Hetman Mikołaj Sieniawski. In either 1541 or 1548, Rej converted to Calvinism. He took part in synods and founded Protestant schools and communities on his lands.
 
Rej took part in sejms and thought his writing an important social mission. He was the first Polish writer to receive a substantial reward for his output. By the end of his life, he owned several villages and oversaw many. He received Temerowce from King Sigismund I the Old, and Dziewięciele from King Sigismund II Augustus as a lifelong possession and two towns, one of them Rejowiec, founded by Rej in 1547. Living during the Golden Liberty embraced by the Polish nobility, tolerance characterized his oversight and this philosophy was carried on by his sons. Rej died at Rejowiec in 1569.

On the five-hundredth anniversary of his birth, Mikolaj Rej was described as a "father of Polish literature", and it also was noted that his grandson, Andrzej Rej (diplomat), royal secretary and Calvinist, is Mikolaj's most prominent offspring. That grandson may be the subject of the 1637 painting by Rembrandt, A Polish Nobleman (perhaps, painted while he was visiting Amsterdam during a trip as a Polish ambassador on a diplomatic mission to the courts of the Danish, the English, and the Dutch).

Works

In 1543 Rej debuted as a writer, under the pen name "Ambroży Korczbok Rożek," with his most famous book, A Brief Discussion among Three Persons: a Lord, a Commune Chief, and a Priest (Krotka rozprawa między trzemi osobami, panem, woytem a plebanem).

Rej's works touch on a large array of matters. He authored prose works that described the ideal of the Polish nobleman, criticized the Catholic Church, and showed a genuine solicitude for his country. His prose syntax is strongly influenced by Latin style.

His poetic meter discloses a deliberate effort to impart to the medieval metrical model with which he was so familiar, a regularity that it lacked. Rej's works include:
 Krótka rozprawa między trzema osobami: Panem, Wójtem i Plebanem (A Brief Discourse among Three Persons: a Lord, a Commune Chief, and a Priest, 1543), written under the pen name, Ambroży Korczbok Rożek 
 Żywot Józefa (The Life of Joseph, 1545).
 Żywot Człowieka Poczciwego (The Life of the Honest Man) 
 Kupiec (The Merchant, 1549) 
 Zwierzyniec (The Bestiary, 1562) 
 Zwierciadło (Speculum), incorporating the three-book prose Wizerunek własny żywota człowieka poczciwego (The Image of a Good Man's Life, 1567–68) 
 Rzecz pospolita albo Sejm pospolity (The Commonwealth, or the General Sejm)

Quotation

Legacy

In commemoration of the five-hundredth anniversary of the birth of Mikołaj Rej, Poland's Sejm (parliament) declared 2005 to be the Year of Mikołaj Rej.

In 1994–97, Rej's descendant and namesake, Nicholas Andrew Rey (1938–2009), served as American Ambassador to Poland.

See also
Polish literature
List of Polish poets
List of Poles

Notes

References
 Czesław Miłosz, The History of Polish Literature, University of California Press, 1984; .

External links 

 A Short Conversation Between Three Persons, a Squire, a Bailiff, and a Parson (selections) by Michał J. Mikoś
 Life of an honest man (selections) by Michał J. Mikoś
 Collected works 

1505 births
1569 deaths
16th-century Polish poets
Converts to Calvinism
Polish Calvinist and Reformed Christians
Polish musicians
16th-century Polish nobility
Mikolaj
16th-century Polish politicians
Polish male poets